This page details the process of qualifying for the 2000 African Cup of Nations.

Preliminary round

|}

Note: both games were played in Kenya.

Gambia withdrew, Senegal advanced automatically.

Mauritania withdrew, Sierra Leone advanced automatically.

Ethiopia withdrew due to Eritrean–Ethiopian War, Eritrea advanced automatically.

Group round
Group round took place between October 2, 1998, and June 20, 1999.

Group 1
Ghana qualified as hosts as of 15 March 1999, their results where annulled. Eritrea qualified for Playoff.

Group 2
Sierra Leone withdrew due to the Sierra Leone Civil War on 22 March 1999,  their result was annulled.

Group 3

Group 4

Group 5
Nigeria qualified as hosts as of 15 March 1999, their results were annulled. Senegal qualified for Playoff.

Group 6

Group 7

Playoff
Eritrea (runners-up of groups 1) and Senegal (runners-up of groups 5) join Zimbabwe in a playoff for one place in the final tournament.

1st leg

2nd leg

Qualified teams

External links
Details at RSSSF

Africa Cup of Nations qualification
Qual
Qual
qualification